Sevas Tra is the debut studio album by the nu metal band Otep, released in 2002. The album name, when read backwards, reads as "art saves". It debuted at number 145 on the Billboard 200.

Music and lyrics
The album's song "Jonestown Tea" features elements of spoken word. The vocals consist of growling, screaming and rapping. The growling on the album is one example of the album's elements of grindcore and death metal. Also, the album has guitar riffs heard in the death metal genre. The album has been compared to Cannibal Corpse, Metallica, Skinlab and Slipknot. Allmusic described the album as "heavier than Slipknot". The album's lyrical topics include organized religion and abuse. The band's vocalist Otep Shamaya said that the album Sevas Tra "is a story about life's struggles and what you do to overcome them, or what you do to be swallowed by them." The album's song "Jonestown Tea" is about child sexual abuse and is also believed to be about Otep Shamaya being sexually abused by her father. The song was used by a teenager who, along with her sister, was sexually abused by their father, to inform her mother about her father's sexual abuse. Otep Shamaya spoke about the song "Jonestown Tea" saying  Otep Shamaya called organized religion "a lie". Many people have mistaken the song "Menocide" to be against men. Otep Shamaya said that it isn't hateful towards men and that it goes against women abuse, including violence against women.

Release 
Sevas Tra was released on June 18, 2002 by Capitol Records. the first 75,000 copies of the album were available as a limited edition tri-fold digipak. A month after its release, the album had sold 15,000 copies in the United States.

Critical reception

The album received positive reviews. Allmusic gave the album a 4 out of 5 stars rating writing "Sevas Tra is a record that raises the high watermark for goth metal." CMJ gave the album an extremely positive review."

Track listing

Personnel
Main personnel
 Otep Shamaya - vocals
 Rob Patterson - guitar
 Jason "eViL j" McGuire - bass, backing vocals
 Mark "Moke" Bistany - drums

Additional personnel
 Producer: Terry Date
 Engineers: Terry Date, Martin Feveyear
 Assistant engineers: Dave Fisher, Anthony Kilhoffer, Floyd Reitsman
 Mixing: Terry Date
 Mastering: Ted Jensen
 Digital editing: Martin Feveyear
 A&R: Ron Laffitte
 Art direction: P.R. Brown, Wendy Dougan
 Jacket design: P.R. Brown
 Booklet design: Wendy Dougan
 Photography: P.R. Brown

Charts
Album - Billboard (North America)

References

Otep albums
2002 debut albums
Capitol Records albums
Albums produced by Terry Date